Ærøskøbing is a town in central Denmark, located in Ærø Municipality on the island of Ærø. The suffix -købing means a trade town in the languages that derive from Old Norse.

Ærøskøbing's houses and streets are delicately restored to retain the character of the olden days. Most of them are one story tall, and the oldest ones date back to 1645.

In the old part of the town are many fine examples of the work of skilled bricklayers, carpenters, and blacksmiths. Behind the idyllic façade of the town is a live and active town that has solved successive generations' housing needs for centuries.

Ærøskøbing was awarded the Europa Nostra prize in 2002. The prize is awarded by the EU as a special appreciation of looking after cultural heritage.

History 
From about 1250 Ærøskøbing was the centre for the island's commercial and maritime trade. A fire in 1629 destroyed a large number of houses, but after this the town experienced a renaissance. Old houses were rebuilt, but also new, larger houses were erected in styles owing much to traditions from Funen, northern Germany and the duchy of Schleswig, under which Ærø was incorporated until 1864, when Ærø was transferred to Denmark (de jure in 1867). The town as it is today illustrates a continuous building culture that has developed over several centuries.

Tourism 
Ærøskøbing Church at the market square is the third church on that location and on the square are the two old town pumps that supplied the town with water right up until 1952.

The Prior's house from 1690 is one of the town's oldest dated buildings. It was purchased and restored in 1917 by Alexis Prior.

The old harbour has been enlarged by a new marina and the beach at Vesterstrand with its colourful little beach huts is only a few minutes' walk from the town and the harbour.

The cook house: Until the middle of the nineteenth century it was forbidden to cook over an open fire on a ship moored in the harbour. The danger of fire on wooden ships was simply too great and the town cook house was built to serve as the harbour cooking facility. The small, whitewashed building is from 1810. The Ærøskøbing Association helped with its restoration in 2001, and now again it serves its original purpose as a place where yachtsmen can prepare food.

The town windmill (of Dutch origin from 1848) has become a landmark for the town, and is approached from the south by the main road.

Twin towns – Sister cities
Ærøskøbing is twinned with:
 Eksjö, Sweden

References

Cities and towns in the Region of Southern Denmark
Ærø